Marcus Ersson (born 27 September 1997) is a Swedish professional ice hockey player. He is currently playing with  Brynäs IF of the Swedish Swedish Hockey League (SHL).

Playing career
Ersson began playing hockey as a youth for Brynäs IF in the 2012–13 season where he played in their under-18 and under-20 teams. In the 2015–16 season, Ersson made his debut in professional hockey, playing 16 games for Brynäs IF of the Swedish Hockey League.

Career statistics

References

External links

1997 births
Living people
Almtuna IS players
Brynäs IF players
Swedish ice hockey defencemen
People from Gävle
Västerviks IK players
Sportspeople from Gävleborg County